The United States competed at the 1936 Winter Olympics in Garmisch-Partenkirchen, Germany.

Medalists 

The following U.S. competitors won medals at the games. In the by discipline sections below, medalists' names are bolded. 

| width="78%" align="left" valign="top" |

Alpine skiing

Men

Women

Bobsleigh

Cross-country skiing

Figure skating

Men

Women

Mixed

Ice hockey

Summary

Roster

First round
Top two teams advanced to semifinals

Second round
Top two teams advanced to Medal round

Medal round

Relevant results from the semifinal were carried over to the final

Nordic combined 

The cross-country skiing part of this event was combined with the 18 kilometer race of cross-country skiing. Those results can be found above in this article in the cross-country skiing section. Some athletes (but not all) entered in both the cross-country skiing and Nordic combined event; their time on the 18 km was used for both events.

The ski jumping (normal hill) event was held separate from the main medal event of ski jumping, results can be found in the table below.

Ski jumping

Speed skating

References

 1936 United States Olympic Men's Ice Hockey at Fanbase
 
 
 Olympic Winter Games 1936, full results by sports-reference.com

Olympics
Nations at the 1936 Winter Olympics
1936